Djinang may refer to:
 Djinang language, and Australian Aboriginal language
 Djinang people, a sub-group of the Yolngu people of Australia